Muneo (written: 宗男 or 宗雄) is a masculine Japanese given name. Notable people with the name include:
 (born 1948), Japanese politician
, Japanese academic
Muneo Yoshikawa (born 1938), Japanese academic and writer

Japanese masculine given names